Samir Saïed (Arabic: سمير سعيد ) (born 1957) is a Tunisian politician. He has been minister of economy and planning in the Bouden Cabinet since 2021.

References 

1957 births
Living people
21st-century Tunisian politicians
École Centrale Paris alumni
Government ministers of Tunisia
Independent politicians in Tunisia
Tunisian businesspeople
Tunisian Muslims